= Corner Pond Brook =

Stream in Connecticut and New York, U.S.

Coordinates: 41.4494444°N 73.5511111°W

Corner Pond Brook is a stream in the U.S. states of Connecticut and New York.

Corner Pond Brook was named for the fact four towns intersected at its watercourse.
